The 1999 Jelajah Malaysia was a cycling stage race that took place in Malaysia. It was held from 3 to 11 November 1999. There were eight stages with a prologue. The race was sanctioned by the Union Cycliste Internationale as a 2.2 category race.

Peter Jörg of Switzerland won the race, followed by Herry Janto Setiawan of Indonesia second and Suyinto of Indonesia third overall.

Stages

Final standings

General classification

External links
 
 Results at cqranking.com
 

Jelajah Malaysia
Jelajah Malaysia
Jelajah Malaysia
November 1999 sports events in Asia